The Valley of the Moon is a children's fantasy park in Tucson, Arizona. It is listed on the National Register of Historic Places listings for Pima County, Arizona. Tucson's city council has zoned it as a historic landmark.

It was originally constructed by George Phar Legler in the early 20th century. The Valley of the Moon is located at 2544 E. Allen Rd, Tucson.

References 

 

Parks in Pima County, Arizona
National Register of Historic Places in Pima County, Arizona